Volunteer Army may refer to:

 Volunteer military
 White movement, the anti-Bolshevik volunteer military during the Russian Civil War
 Volunteer Army, a counter-revolutionary military unit during the Russian Civil War
 Volunteer Force (Great Britain), the British volunteer military
 Volunteer Army (Poland), a volunteer outfit during the Polish-Soviet War